William Seymour may refer to:
William Seymour (MP for Herefordshire) (died 1391), MP for Herefordshire (UK Parliament constituency)
William Digby Seymour (1805–1872), MP for Kingston-upon-Hull
William Digby Seymour (1822–1895), QC, lawyer and poet, MP for Sunderland and Somerset
William H. Seymour (1840–1913), American politician
William J. Seymour (1870–1922), American Pentecostal minister
William Kean Seymour (1887–1975), British writer
William Seymour Jr. (1818–1882), American banker who twice served as president of the New York Stock Exchange
William Seymour (Congressman) (1775–1848), US Representative from New York from 1835 to 1837
William Seymour (British Army officer, born 1664) (1664–1728), Lieutenant-General, MP for Cockermouth, Totnes and Newport (Isle of Wight) 
William Seymour, 2nd Duke of Somerset (1588–1660)
William Seymour, 3rd Duke of Somerset (1652–1671)
William Seymour Tyler (1810–1897), American historian
William Henry Seymour (1829–1921), British Army officer
Lord William Seymour (British Army officer) (1838–1915), senior British Army officer